Alfredo Arpaia (14 August 1930 – 6 January 2019) was an Italian politician who served as a Member of Parliament between 1982 and 1983.

Arpaia served as President of the Italian League for Human Rights from 2002 to 2016 and from 2017 as member of the board of the Corpo Italiano di San Lazzaro.

References

2019 deaths
Italian politicians
1930 births